Fred Taylor (born November 5, 1957) is an American retired sprinter.
Taylor qualified for the 1980 U.S. Olympic team but did not compete due to the 1980 Summer Olympics boycott. He did however receive one of 461 Congressional Gold Medals created especially for the spurned athletes.

References

1957 births
Living people
American male sprinters
Universiade medalists in athletics (track and field)
Place of birth missing (living people)
Congressional Gold Medal recipients
Universiade gold medalists for the United States
Medalists at the 1979 Summer Universiade